Dominik Schmid may refer to:

 Dominik Schmid (handballer) (born 1989), Austrian handball player
 Dominik Schmid (footballer, born 1989), German footballer
 Dominik Schmid (footballer, born 1998), Swiss footballer

See also
 Dominik Schmidt (born 1987), German footballer